Rinkuškiai is a Lithuanian brewery, established in 1991.

History 
The godfather of brewery "Rinkuškiai" can be considered Jonas Čygas, he was known as one of the best beer makers of Biržai. Jonas Čygas makes barley beer for christenings, weddings, anniversaries and other celebrations. Soviet officials were not ashamed to carry off his brewed beer for highest authorities. Brewing secrets, Rimantas teaches from his father. Rimantas Čygas have suggested Sigitas Kalkys to the beer business. Beer was started in Petras Kalkys and Sigitas Kalkys urban-type house, based in Biržai village. Rimantas Čygas brought from his father's brewing technology, Sigitas Kalkys with university degree in civil engineering, has taken the technical part. Later the building was rebuilt, the owners are buying new equipment and continued to refine the brewery. It has grown to the current brewery Rinkuškiai brewery, the Lithuanian beer market, holding an honorable 5th place.

References

External links
Official site

Beer in Lithuania
Food and drink companies established in 1991
Lithuanian companies established in 1991
Lithuanian brands